Sunday at Home was a weekly magazine published in London by the Religious Tract Society beginning in 1854. It was one of the most successful examples of the "Sunday reading" genre of periodicals: inexpensive magazines intended to provide wholesome religious (or religiously-inspired) entertainment for families to read on Sundays, especially as a substitute for "pernicious" secular penny weeklies such as The London Journal or The Family Herald.

It was initially edited by James Macaulay, and later by W. Stevens. Macaulay and Stevens also edited The Leisure Hour, a similar periodical which debuted two years earlier and was also published by the Religious Tract Society, though Sunday at Home was more overtly religious and had a more strongly Sabbatarian viewpoint. Like The Leisure Hour, a typical issue of Sunday at Home led with a serialized piece of religious fiction, and included at least one large illustration.

In addition to the penny weekly format, the magazine was issued in monthly parts at a price of five pence (raised to 6p in 1863), and annual volumes ranging in price from around 5 to 10 shillings.

In 1862, the magazine began including colour illustrations, apparently the first penny weekly to do so.

In 1865, the magazine had an annual circulation of 130,000 copies, which increased steadily up to 1875.

Citations

External links

 Links to archives of full issues of Sunday at Home via the Online Books Page

Religious magazines
Defunct magazines published in the United Kingdom
Magazines established in 1854
1854 establishments in the United Kingdom